Henry Arkwright (26 March 1811 – 13 January 1889) was an English cricketer with amateur status. He was associated with Cambridge University and made his first-class debut in 1829.

He was born at Willersley Castle in Derbyshire and educated at Eton College and Trinity College, Cambridge. He became a Church of England vicar and was the vicar of Bodenham in Herefordshire, from 1842 until 1888, shortly before his death at Bodenham.

References

1811 births
1889 deaths
People educated at Eton College
Alumni of Trinity College, Cambridge
English cricketers
English cricketers of 1826 to 1863
Cambridge University cricketers
19th-century English Anglican priests